Surdeşti or Şurdeşti may refer to several villages in Romania:

 Surdeşti, a village in Sohodol Commune, Alba County
 , a village in Şişeşti Commune, Maramureș County
 Surdeşti, a village in Breaza town, Prahova County

See also 
 Surdu (disambiguation)
 Surduc (disambiguation)
 Surducu (disambiguation)
 Surdila (disambiguation)